Shibli Mohammad is a Bangladeshi dancer and choreographer. He is the co-director of "Nrityanchal Dance Company".

Education
Mohammad completed his bachelor's in Physics from Jahangir Nagar University. He took dance lessons from Kartic Singh, Ajit Dey and Anita Dey at the Chhayanaut in Dhaka. He was awarded an Indian Government scholarship to train. He was taught by Shreemati Purnima Pande at the Bhatkhande Music Institute in Lucknow, India. Next he studied under Birju Maharaj in National Institute of Kathak Dance in New Delhi. He also received training in ballet and contemporary dance, as well as tap and jazz for a year at the London Ballet Theatre School.

Career
Mohammad was the principal male dancer at the Shilpakala Academy. Since 2007, he and Shamim Ara Nipa have been running a television show Tarana on BTV.

Personal life
Mohammad have 9 siblings including Shameem Mohammad and singer Sadi Mohammad. Their father, Salimullah, was killed during the Liberation War of Bangladesh in 1971.

Awards
 UNESCO award for Best Bangladeshi dancer
 George Harrison Award for Dance 
 Jaijaidin Award
 Bachshash Award
 Prothom Alo Award
 Lux Channel I Award

References

Further reading

Living people
Bangladeshi male dancers
Jahangirnagar University alumni
Bangladeshi choreographers
Year of birth missing (living people)